Ahenkorah is a Ghanaian surname. Notable people with the surname include:

Akua Sakyiwaa Ahenkorah, Ghanaian diplomat
Alfred Ofosu-Ahenkorah, Ghanaian energy official
Carlos Kingsley Ahenkorah (born 1966), Ghanaian politician
Deborah Ahenkorah (born 1987), Ghanaian educator and activist

Ghanaian surnames